Leibold is a German surname. It may refer to:

Friedrich Ernst Leibold (1804–1864), German gardener and botanical collector
Nemo Leibold (1892–1977), U.S baseball player
Paul Francis Leibold (1914–1972), U.S. Roman Catholic Bishop
Tim Leibold (born 1993), German footballer

See also
Leybold